Hawke ministry may refer to:

Australian Commonwealth ministries:
 First Hawke ministry 1983–1984
 Second Hawke ministry 1984–1987
 Third Hawke ministry 1987–1990
 Fourth Hawke ministry 1990–1991

Other:
 Hawke ministry (Western Australia) 1953–1959